Scarsdale Magazine is a regional lifestyle magazine that covers the village of Scarsdale, New York and its surrounding area (Hartsdale, Eastchester, Edgemont, Greenburgh, Tuckahoe, etc.). It is published by the local (Rockland, Westchester, Putnam) newspaper, The Journal News, a division of Gannett. The publication was originally launched as InTown Scarsdale, but changed names to Scarsdale Magazine at the beginning of 2006.

External links  
 Scarsdale Magazine website

Lifestyle magazines published in the United States
Local interest magazines published in the United States
Magazines established in 2005
Magazines published in New York (state)